Stewart Hayward (born November 27, 1973) is a Canadian professional dirt track racing driver. In 2015, he competed in the NASCAR Camping World Truck Series, driving the No. 74 Ram for Mike Harmon Racing.

Racing career
During the 2000s, Hayward competed in kart racing. In 2009, he began racing in the WISSOTA  Alberta Late Models.

In 2015, Hayward made his NASCAR Camping World Truck Series debut at Eldora Speedway, driving the No. 74 for Mike Harmon Racing; the truck was the lone Ram Trucks entrant in the race, though it used decals from a Chevrolet Impala. He started 31st and finished 32nd after an engine failure.

Motorsports career results

NASCAR
(key) (Bold – Pole position awarded by qualifying time. Italics – Pole position earned by points standings or practice time. * – Most laps led.)

Camping World Truck Series

References

External links
 

1973 births
NASCAR drivers
Living people
Sportspeople from Calgary
Racing drivers from Alberta
Canadian racing drivers